Mihalis Rakintzis (Greek: Μιχάλης Ρακιντζής) is a Greek singer. He was born in Athens, on 3 April 1957, and studied Mechanical Engineering in Great Britain. From 1982 to 1985, he participated at a rock group called Scraptown. After three albums & a maxi-single Scraptown split up and Rakintzis started a solo career.

Readers of the music magazine Popcorn voted him "Best singer of the Year" in 1991. Mihalis Rakintzis worked with international stars such as Ian Gillan from Deep Purple, rocksinger Bonnie Tyler and Wee Papa Girl Rappers. He has also written songs for other Greek artists, such as Paschalis, Eleni Dimou, Dimitris Kontolazos, Sophia Arvaniti, Stelios Dionisiou, and Vassilis Karras.

Mihalis participated in the Eurovision Song Contest 2002 in Tallinn with the song "S.A.G.A.P.O." (I Love You) which took the 17th place.

Discography

International discography
Albums
1982 Scraptown
1983 Rules of the Game
1985 Give Me a Break

Singles
1984 "Viva Sahara" (maxi single-promo edition)

Local discography
Albums
1987 – Moro Mou Faltso (with Eleni Demou)
1988 - Isovia
1989 – Dikaioma Gia Mia + Mia
1989 – Dikaioma Gia Mia + Mia "Second Edition" with bonus track "Nana"
1990 – Apagogi
1990 – Apagogi 'Special Cd Edition'
1991 – Na Eisai Ekei
1992 – Etsi M' Aresei (with Ian Gillan)
1994 – Ethinikos
1995 – H Proti Apeili
1996 – Trance Mix
1997 – Se Ena Vrady oti Zisoume (with Vasilis Karras)
1997 – Se Ena Vrady oti Zisoume "Special Edition" with bonus track "Beba"
1998 – Kathreftis
1999 – Ton Filo Sou Zilevo
2001 – Oneiro 13
2002 – S.A.G.A.P.O.
2003 – Solo (2cds) (First CD – new songs, second CD – remakes of older songs)
2005 – Bar Code (with T.D.A./Talenta Dihos Avrio and Afroditi Delgado)
2006 – Made in Greece (with Trilogy)
2008 – Energia (with Trilogy)
2011 – Back to the Φuture "Black Edition" (with Sofia Arvaniti, Alex Trigs (English lyrics), Nadia Zahoor (Indian lyrics), Dimitra Tsalopoulou)
2011 – Back to the Φuture "White Edition" (with Sofia Arvaniti, Alex Trigs (English lyrics), Nadia Zahoor (Indian lyrics), Dimitra Tsalopoulou)
2012 – HardStyle (released online)

Singles
1987 – "Moro Mou Faltso"
1992 – "Get Away" (with Ian Gillan)
1995 – "Kardoula Mou Ego Ki Esy"
1997 – "Beba"
1998 – "Se Ena Katastroma"
2000 – "Oti Kaneis Sou Kano"
2002 – "S.A.G.A.P.O." (maxi single-Promo Europe Edition) (released in Europe)
2002 – "S.A.G.A.P.O." (maxi single-Limited Edition)
2002 – "S.A.G.A.P.O." (maxi single-Special Edition)
2004 – "Geysi Apo Sena" (maxi single-Internet Edition)
2008 – "Erfoi" (maxi single-Internet Edition)
2013 – "Hardstyle2" (maxi-single released online)

Soundtrack appearances
1988 – Isovia (original soundtrack of Giannis Dalianidis)
2010 – Show Bitch (original soundtrack of Nikos Zervos)

Compilation albums
1992 – The Very Best of Mihalis Rakintzis 
2006 – Dekatessera Megala Tragoudia
2006 – Dekatessera Megala Tragoudia "Second Edition" (with other cover)
2006 – Etsi Ksafnika (2cds)

Music for TV
Music composition titles for comic ERT2 TV series I Alepou Kai O Mpoufos/The Fox and the Fool (with George Constantine, Giovanna Fragouli, Dina Consta, Carmen Ruggeri, Dimitra Papadopoulou, Tasos Kostis, etc.) (1987–1988) the series aired in 1989 in Australia by SBS entitled "The Fox and the Fool"
Music composition titles for the film Panos Michalopoulos – "Ena Moro Sto Taxi Mou/A Baby in My Taxi" (1989)
Music composition titles for the program Greek Style/Styl gr by Theodore Rakitzis ("Savvato Vrady/Saturday Night" title track)
 Music composition titles for the program of the Constantina Stephanopoulou ("Geysi Zois/Taste of Life" the title track)
 Music composition titles for the program of the Christina Lambiri Super Star of Star Channel (Mihalis Rakintzis – Christina Lambiri, Theodore Rakitzis, Henry Petilon) (2006–2011)
 Music composition for advertising "Jannis" nougat (2011)

Music for children
 2002 Participation of Mihalis Rakintzis with the song "To Dialeimma/The Break" the album of children's book writer and musician Letta Vasileiou and the Timos Papasokratis entitled Asimoprasino Dasos/Silver Green Forest – The School of Animal "(Acroasis 2002)

References

External links
 Official page (in Greek)

1957 births
Living people
Eurovision Song Contest entrants for Greece
Eurovision Song Contest entrants of 2002
20th-century Greek male singers
Greek pop singers
21st-century Greek male singers
Singers from Athens
Greek singer-songwriters